Charaxes ameliae, the blue-spotted charaxes, is a butterfly in the family Nymphalidae. It is found in Guinea, Sierra Leone, Liberia, Ivory Coast, Ghana, Togo, Nigeria, Cameroon, Gabon, the Republic of the Congo, the Central African Republic, the Democratic Republic of the Congo, Uganda, Kenya, Zambia, Tanzania and Malawi.

Description

Ch. ameliae Doumet  forewing above black with the following blue markings: a broad longitudinal streak in the cell, an angular spot at the apex of the cell, a spot behind the middle of the costal margin, 8 rather large submarginal spots and small marginal spots. On the hindwing an anteriorly narrowed median band, rounded submarginal spots and fine marginal streaks are blue. On the under surface the black transverse streaks in cellules 2, 4-7 are placed in an almost straight line and are distally accompanied by a whitish band. The female is much larger and has the ground-colour above black-brown and all the markings white or yellowish white. The cell of the forewing is unmarked; the median band of the hindwing reaches the inner margin, is basally widened and is continuous on the forewing as far as vein 2; the proximal spots of cellules 2-7, which in the male are almost all wanting, are here large and distinct, but the distal ones scarcely larger 
than in the on the underside of the hindwing the light median band is broader and more distinct. The tail at vein 2 is short in both sexes, much shorter than the one at vein 4. This magnificent species occurs every where in the West African forest-region and is distributed to Aruwimi and to Nyassaland. 
In 1900, a full description was given by Walter Rothschild and Karl Jordan in Novitates Zoologicae. See volume 7:287-524 pages 391-394 (for terms see volume 5:545-601).

Biology
The habitat consists of Afrotropical forests and Brachystegia woodland (Miombo).

The larvae feed on Brachystegia spiciformis, Julbernardia globiflora, Albizia adianthifolia and Baikiaea insignis.

Taxonomy
Charaxes tiridates group

The supposed clade members are:

Charaxes tiridates
Charaxes numenes similar to next
Charaxes bipunctatus similar to last
Charaxes violetta
Charaxes fuscus
Charaxes mixtus
Charaxes bubastis
Charaxes albimaculatus
Charaxes barnsi
Charaxes bohemani
Charaxes schoutedeni
Charaxes monteiri
Charaxes smaragdalis
Charaxes xiphares
Charaxes cithaeron
Charaxes nandina
Charaxes imperialis
Charaxes ameliae
Charaxes pythodoris
? Charaxes overlaeti
For a full list see Eric Vingerhoedt, 2013.

Subspecies
C. a. ameliae (Nigeria, Cameroon, Gabon, Congo, Central African Republic, Democratic Republic of the Congo)
C. a. amelina Joicey & Talbot, 1925 (Tanzania: Kigoma, Malawi, northern Zambia, Democratic Republic of the Congo: Shaba)
C. a. doumeti Henning, 1989  (Guinea, Sierra Leone, Liberia, Ivory Coast, Ghana, Togo, western Nigeria)
C. a. victoriae van Someren, 1972  Uganda, western Kenya, north-western Tanzania)

References

Seitz, A. Die Gross-Schmetterlinge der Erde 13: Die Afrikanischen Tagfalter. Plate XIII 31
Victor Gurney Logan Van Someren, 1972 Revisional notes on African Charaxes (Lepidoptera: Nymphalidae). Part VIII. Bulletin of the British Museum (Natural History) (Entomology)215-264.

External links
Images of C. ameliae ameliae Royal Museum for Central Africa (Albertine Rift Project)
Charaxes ameliae images at Charaxes page Consortium for the Barcode of Life subspecies and forms
African Butterfly Database Range map via search

Butterflies described in 1861
ameliae
Butterflies of Africa